I, Davros is a Big Finish Productions audio play based on the long-running British science fiction television series Doctor Who. It stars Terry Molloy reprising his role as Davros, the twisted creator of the Dalek race. The series explores Davros' early life on Skaro. According to Gary Russell, the title is an allusion to the drama  I, Claudius.

Episodes

Series 1 (2006)

Special (2012)

References

Audio plays based on Doctor Who
Big Finish Productions
Doctor Who spin-offs
Black comedy